The year 2006 was the 10th year in the history of the Pride Fighting Championships, a mixed martial arts promotion based in Japan. 2006 had 10 events beginning with, Pride 31 - Unbreakable.

Title fights

Debut Pride FC fighters

The following fighters fought their first Pride FC fight in 2006:

 Clay French
 Cristiano Marcello
 Cyrille Diabate
 Dae Won Kim
 David Baron
 David Bielkheden
 Edson Claas Vieira
 Eldari Kurtanidze
 Eric Esch
 Eun-Su Lee
 Evangelista Santos
 Gegard Mousasi
 Gilbert Melendez
 Gregory Bouchelaghem

 Hatsu Hioki
 Hector Lombard
 Jason Black
 Jean-Francois Lenogue
 Jeff Curran
 Joe Pearson
 Joey Villasenor
 John Olav Einemo
 Kenji Arai
 Luciano Azevedo
 Mark Weir
 Mike Plotcheck
 Mitsuhiro Ishida

 Naoki Matsushita
 Nobuhiro Obiya
 Olaf Alfonso
 Paul Rodriguez
 Robbie Lawler
 Sean O'Haire
 Seichi Ikemoto
 Shinya Aoki
 Tae Hyun Lee
 Travis Galbraith
 Won Jin Eoh
 Yoshihiro Nakao
 Yosuke Nishijima

Events list

Pride 31: Unbreakable

Pride 31: Unbreakable was an event held on February 26, 2006, at the Saitama Super Arena in Saitama, Japan.

Results

Pride FC: Bushido 10

Pride FC: Bushido 10 was an event held on April 2, 2006, at Ariake Coliseum in Tokyo, Japan.

Results

Pride FC: Total Elimination Absolute

Pride FC: Total Elimination Absolute was an event held on May 5, 2006, at Osaka Dome in Osaka, Japan.

This event featured the first round of Pride's 2006 Open-Weight tournament. Seven tournament matches were held along with one alternate match. The seven winning participants advanced to the second round, Pride Critical Countdown Absolute. The winner of the alternate bout will take the place of any fighter who is unable to participate in subsequent matches.

Pride Heavyweight Champion and 2004 Heavyweight Grand Prix winner Fedor Emelianenko was originally set to enter the tournament with a first round bye, but a hand injury prevented him from participating. Wanderlei Silva, then current Pride middleweight champion, received his bye into the second round.

Results

2006 Pride Open-Weight Grand Prix Bracket

1Fedor Emelianenko suffered a hand injury and could not participate in the tournament. He was replaced by Wanderlei Silva.

Pride FC: Bushido 11

Pride FC: Bushido 11 was an event held on June 4, 2006, at Saitama Super Arena in Saitama, Japan.

Results

Pride 2006 Welterweight Grand Prix Bracket

Pride FC: Critical Countdown Absolute

Pride FC: Critical Countdown Absolute was an event held on July 1, 2006, at Saitama Super Arena in Saitama, Japan.

Results

2006 Pride Open-Weight Grand Prix Bracket

1Fedor Emelianenko suffered a hand injury and could not participate in the tournament. He was replaced by Wanderlei Silva.

Pride FC: Bushido 12

Pride FC: Bushido 12 was an event held on August 27, 2006, at Nagoya Rainbow Hall in Nagoya, Japan.

Results

Pride 2006 Welterweight Grand Prix Bracket

Pride FC: Final Conflict Absolute

Pride FC: Final Conflict Absolute was an event held on September 10, 2006, at Saitama Super Arena in Saitama, Japan.

This event comprised the semifinal and final rounds of the Pride Open-Weight Grand Prix tournament.  The tournament began on May 5, 2006, at the Total Elimination Absolute event and then continued on July 1, 2006, at Critical Countdown Absolute.

On August 5, 2006, Mirko Cro Cop announced his withdrawal from the tournament following a dispute over pay with Pride. On August 7, 2006, it was reported that the matter had been resolved and Cro Cop would once again take his place in the finals.

Results

2006 Pride Open-Weight Grand Prix Bracket

1Fedor Emelianenko suffered a hand injury and could not participate in the tournament. He was replaced by Wanderlei Silva.

Pride 32: The Real Deal

Pride FC: Bushido 13

Pride FC: Bushido 13 was an event held on November 5, 2006, at Yokohama Arena in Yokohama, Japan.

This event consisted of the semifinal and final rounds of the Bushido Welterweight Grand Prix.

In a lightweight championship bout, Takanori Gomi faced Marcus Aurélio, who had defeated Gomi in a non-title fight at Pride Bushido 10.

Originally Gilbert Melendez was set to face Shinya Aoki but an injury during training forced Melendez to withdraw from the fight. Clay French replaced Melendez in the fight.

Results

2006 Welterweight Grand Prix bracket

1 Paulo Filho dropped from the Grand Prix due to injuries sustained during his bout with Kazuo Misaki, who replaced him in the final round against Denis Kang.

Pride FC: Shockwave 2006

See also
 Pride Fighting Championships
 List of Pride Fighting Championships champions
 List of Pride Fighting events

References

Pride Fighting Championships events
2006 in mixed martial arts